Tampere University of Technology (TUT) was Finland's second-largest university in engineering sciences. The university was located in Hervanta, a suburb of Tampere. It was merged with the University of Tampere to create the new Tampere University on 1 January 2019.

The university's statutory duty was to pursue research and give the highest education in its field. The research, conducted by some 1,800 staff and faculty members, mostly focused on applied science and often has close ties to many different companies (such as Nokia). Located next to the university campus is a Technology Centre Hermia, including a large Nokia research facility. TUT was one of the only two Finnish universities which operate as foundation. The yearly budget of the university was some 147 million euros. Close to 50% of its budget was external funding. According to Times Higher Education, it ranked 11th in the world, and 4th in Europe, for industry collaboration.

History 

From the late 19th century, Tampere had been the most important industrial center in Finland. The Technical Institute of Tampere had provided engineers for its industries since 1911, but all higher technological education in Finland took place in Helsinki University of Technology. In the 1950s, the city of Tampere started actively remedying the situation, first founding a municipal science library in 1955. This library formed the core for the libraries of the TUT and the medical faculty of the University of Tampere In 1960, city succeeded in persuading the small private university Yhteiskunnallinen korkeakoulu to move to Tampere from Helsinki. A few years later, this university changed its name to University of Tampere.

The founding of the Tampere University of Technology was one of the steps of the city and the local business life in bringing higher education to the region. The university was founded in 1965 as a branch of Helsinki University of Technology and became an independent university status in 1972. The Student Union of Tampere University of Technology (Tampereen teknillisen yliopiston ylioppilaskunta, TTYY) was also established alongside the university.

In 2003, the university changed its Finnish name from TTKK (Tampereen teknillinen korkeakoulu) to TTY (Tampereen teknillinen yliopisto) so that the Finnish name would be closer to the English name and to distinguish itself from polytechnics that are not universities in the meaning of the Humboldtian university ideal or in the meaning of the Finnish law.

As a part of the Finnish university reform, Tampere University of Technology chose to become one of the two Finnish universities operating as foundations in the beginning of 2010. The university hopes that compared to the previous form of state agency, the foundation form gives it more operational freedom.

A programme, called Tampere3, to merge the university with University of Tampere and Tampere University of Applied Sciences was started in the spring of 2014. The merger was approved by Parliament in December 2017 and came into effect on 1 January 2019. The new foundation-based interdisciplinary higher education institution is named Tampere University. The new university will comprise 35,000 students and 5,000 employees, thus, being the second largest university in Finland.

Faculties
Tampere University of Technology comprises five faculties:
Faculty of Biomedical Sciences and Engineering:
Institute of Biosciences and Medical Technology (BioMediTech), joint institute of TUT and UTA
Faculty of Business and Built Environment:
School of Architecture
Department of Civil Engineering
Department of Industrial and Information Management
Language Centre
Centre for Professional Development Edutech
Faculty of Computing and Electrical Engineering
Department of Electrical Energy Engineering
Department of Electronics and Communications Engineering
Department of Pervasive Computing
Department of Signal Processing
Faculty of Engineering Sciences
Department of Automation and Hydraulic Engineering
Department of Mechanical Engineering and Industrial Systems
Department of Materials Science
Faculty of Natural Sciences
Department of Chemistry and Bioengineering
Department of Mathematics
Department Photonics
Department of Physics

Research

Tampere University of Technology is primarily a research university, which specializes in technology and architecture. While all departments pursue scientific research and publish in international, peer-reviewed journals, the strongest areas of the university are signal processing, nanophotonics, biotechnology, and intelligent mobile hydraulic systems. The university has one Finnish Center of Excellence, the Signal Processing Laboratory. In addition, it participates in two other Finnish Centers of Excellence. Among other things, the university has been developing the world's first: biodegradable joint implant, communicator, yellow laser and walking harvester.

In 2014, the researchers of TUT published 1586 papers in peer-reviewed international publications, meaning an average of a more than one article per researcher. The university has 133 full professors, 193 tenured lecturers, and 754 researchers, of which 22% are international employees.

Tampere University of Technology has been selected three times as one of the best universities under 50 years old by Times Higher Education and QS World University Rankings has ranked it twice among the best 50 young universities in the World.

Research assessment 2011

An international independent team made an assessment of research quality in TUT in 2011. The Assessment Scale was: Outstanding International Level (5), Very Good International Level (4), Good International Level (3), Fair International Level (2), and Poor International Level (1). When comparing the results between different faculties, the results are not comparable as the assessment was done by different group of people for different faculties. Intra-faculty comparisons however can be done based on the results. Furthermore, the numerical evaluations were accompanied with the verbal assessments, which give better understanding than the plain integer numbers. Overall, the results were mostly in the range of Very Good and Good International Level.

HR excellence in research

In recognition of development activities related to research careers and the position of researchers at the University, the European Commission awarded Tampere University of Technology the right to use the HR Excellence in Research logo in spring 2014.

The logo demonstrates that the working conditions and career opportunities of research staff at TUT comply with recommendations given by the European Commission in The European Charter for Researchers and The Code of Conduct for the Recruitment of Researchers. The Charter & Code aim to give equal rights and obligations to individual researchers throughout Europe, therefore improving mobility and working conditions as well as reinforcing research and development across Europe.

Education

Undergraduate degree programs

The university awards undergraduate degrees of tekniikan kandidaatti (Bachelor of Science in Technology (B.Sc. Tech.) or Architecture (B.Sc. Arch.), diplomi-insinööri (Master of Science in Technology (M.Sc. Tech.), and arkkitehti (M.Sc. Arch.). The recommended time for the completion of master's degree is five years (3 for B.Sc. and 2 for M.Sc.) to complete. In practice, the students use little bit less than seven years for their studies, on average. However, this average includes the compulsory military service of 6–12 months that most of the male students (76% of the student body) complete before graduation. Yearly, some 800–850 masters graduate from TUT.

Studies leading up to a M.Sc. available in the Finnish language are:
Architecture
Automation Engineering
Biotechnology
Civil Engineering
Electrical Engineering
Environmental and Energy Technology
Industrial Engineering and Management
Information and Knowledge Management
Information Technology
Materials Engineering
Fibre and Textile Engineering
Mechanical Engineering
Science and Engineering
Mathematical Sciences Subject Teacher Education

International undergraduate degree programs
In August 2016 the first completely English taught B.Sc. program in the field of engineering in Finland started at TUT. The program of Science and Engineering aims to provide students a multi-disciplinary basic knowledge on different engineering and scientific subjects and offer a wide range of possibilities to continue studies in TUT's master's degree programs in English. Possible major subjects are Mathematics, Physics, and Information and Communications Technology.

Apart from the programs in the Finnish language, these M.Sc. programs are available in English:
Sustainable Architecture
Bioengineering
Automation Engineering
Electrical Engineering
Industrial Engineering and Management
Information Technology
Materials Science
Science and Engineering

Post-Graduate degree programs
All programs leading to M.Sc. also offer the possibility of continuing research until a doctoral degree. As usual in Finland, the completion of doctoral degree requires a certain number of courses taught (worth at least 60 ECTS) and a dissertation containing original scientific research, usually published in international peer-reviewed journals. Depending on the prior education of the student, the doctoral degree is either tekniikan tohtori (Doctor of Science in Technology or Architecture) or filosofian tohtori (Doctor of Philosophy). As a general rule, the graduate students with a master's degree in Technology or Architecture will be awarded the Doctor of Science degree, while graduate students with a master's degree in other majors will be awarded the degree of Doctor of Philosophy. A tekniikan lisensiaatti (Licentiate of Technology) is also available. Yearly, some 70 doctors graduate. The mean age of new doctors is 34.

Student life

Student life at Tampere is especially vivid as three universities are located at the area. The students of technology (teekkarit) are especially noticeable, as they wear a distinctive hat with a tuft (teekkarilakki) on many occasions, both formal and informal. These student caps with a tuft are shared by every university in Finland that educates students of technology but the caps are slightly visually different in every university. Students of technology are also famous for student pranks (Finnish: jäynä), similar in principle to MIT hacks.

All undergraduate students are members of the Student Union of Tampere University of Technology. Post-graduate students are given the option of joining. In addition to the student union, students join numerous associations for studies, cultural activity, and sports. Each of the 14 guilds at TUT serve the students in their respective study program and has their uniquely coloured student boilersuit. There are also numerous other clubs that focus on different hobbies, such as, eSports, alpine skiing, sailing, photographing and skydiving.

More notable leisure clubs:
 Remmi-Team – Eco-marathon vehicles club 
 26 Finnish championships,
 81 podium positions in different categories, and
 12 victories in international student-classes.
 Castor – Space club 
 Supikoira Rocket: First model rocket in Finland to climb up to  altitude.
 Itikka Project: First Finnish images from Space.
 Tampere Academic Symphony Orchestra

International clubs:
AIESEC
International Association for the Exchange of Students for Technical Experience
Electrical Engineering Students' European Association
European Students of Industrial Engineering and Management
Erasmus Student Network

Student housing

Most of the undergraduate students at Tampere are living in apartments offered by the Tampere Student Housing Foundation (TOAS). TOAS offers different kinds of housing options also near the Hervanta campus. The apartments are typically small studios and shared flats. The most well-known student housing complex in Tampere region is Mikontalo.

Notable people and alumni

Jarl-Thure Eriksson - Professor Emeritus, Rector 1997–2008
Jorma Rissanen - Professor Emeritus, IEEE Richard W. Hamming Medal
Mikko Kaasalainen - PhD, Applied mathematician and mathematical physicist
Hailemariam Desalegn – M.Sc. (Tech.), Prime Minister of Ethiopia
Rainer Mahlamäki - M.Sc. (Arch.), Architect
Tapio Kuula - M.Sc. (Tech.) and M.Ec., President and CEO of Fortum
Jouko Karvinen - M.Sc. (Tech.), Former CEO of Stora Enso
Matti Kähkönen - M.Sc. (Tech.), President and CEO of Metso
Ari Luotonen - M.Sc. (Tech.), Developer of CERN httpd
Kari Jormakka - PhD, Architect
Hille Korhonen - M.Sc. (Tech.), CEO of Alko
Johanna Lamminen - Lic.Sc. (Tech.), CEO of Gasum
Matti Viikinkoski - PhD, Mathematician specializing in inverse problems

Rectors
 Jaakko Puhakka 2018
 Mika Hannula 2016–2018
 Markku Kivikoski 2008–2016
 Jarl-Thure Eriksson 1997–2008
 Timo Lepistö 1985–1996
 Osmo Hassi 1975–1985
 Pekka Ahonen 1972–1975

See also
Institute of technology
List of universities in Finland
Mikontalo
University Consortium of Pori

References

External links

  Tampere University of Technology Official site, tut.fi

 
Technical universities and colleges in Finland
Educational institutions established in 1972
1965 establishments in Finland
Hervanta
Universities and colleges formed by merger in Finland